Milford is a historic railroad station located at Milford, Sussex County, Delaware.  It was built in the early 1860s, and is a one-story, five bay, brick building with a hipped roof and extended overhangs.

It was added to the National Register of Historic Places in 1983 as the Milford Railroad Station.  The station is no longer in use, though the track behind it is still used by a Delmarva Central Railroad freight line.

An engine shed was shown at this location on an atlas dated 1859, also including a turntable. Nine years later, another atlas displayed both the engine shed and the station, and a freight station was subsequently added. 

A marble plaque is located there, honoring the men who inaugurated the railroad, including Governor Peter F. Causey, who served on its first Board of Directors.  The railroad enabled farmers to more cheaply brings crops to market, especially peaches.  The structure today looks almost the same as it did when first built in the nineteenth century. In recent years, a local business has been housed there, called Hermann Financial Services.

References

Railway stations on the National Register of Historic Places in Delaware
Buildings and structures in Sussex County, Delaware
Former Pennsylvania Railroad stations
Milford, Delaware
National Register of Historic Places in Sussex County, Delaware
Railway stations in the United States opened in 1862
Former railway stations in Delaware